Oleoylethanolamide (OEA) is an endogenous peroxisome proliferator-activated receptor alpha (PPAR-α) agonist. It is a naturally occurring ethanolamide lipid that regulates feeding and body weight in vertebrates ranging from mice to pythons.

OEA is a shorter, monounsaturated analogue of the endocannabinoid anandamide, but unlike anandamide it acts independently of the cannabinoid pathway, regulating PPAR-α activity to stimulate lipolysis.

OEA is produced by the small intestine following feeding in two steps.  First an N-acyl transferase (NAT) activity joins the free amino terminus of phosphatidylethanolamine (PE) to the oleoyl group (one variety of acyl group) derived from sn-1-oleoyl-phosphatidylcholine, which contains the fatty acid oleic acid at the sn-1 position.  This produces an N-acylphosphatidylethanolamine, which is then split (hydrolyzed) by N-acyl phosphatidylethanolamine-specific phospholipase D (NAPE-PLD) into phosphatidic acid and OEA. The biosynthesis of OEA and other bioactive lipid amides is modulated by bile acids.

OEA has been demonstrated to bind to the novel cannabinoid receptor GPR119. OEA has been suggested to be the receptor's endogenous ligand.

OEA has been hypothesized to play a key role in the inhibition of food seeking behavior and in the lipolysis of brown bears "ursus arctos" during the hibernation season together with the alteration of the endocannabinoid system required for the metabolic changes for hibernation.

OEA has been reported to lengthen the life span of the roundworm Caenorhabditis elegans through interactions with lysomal molecules.

References

External links 
 Science Magazine
 BBC: Fatty foods 'offer memory boost'

Neurotransmitters
Fatty acid amides
Endocannabinoids